Michael John Love (born 27 November 1973) is an English footballer who most recently played for Northern Premier League Division One South side Barwell, where he played as a defender. Now a coach in and around the Midlands, and current coach with the University of Warwick Men's Football Club.

Playing career
He made a total of 9 appearances for Sligo.

External links

1973 births
Living people
Footballers from Stockport
Association football defenders
English footballers
Hinckley Athletic F.C. players
Wigan Athletic F.C. players
Wycombe Wanderers F.C. players
Sligo Rovers F.C. players
Stevenage F.C. players
Tamworth F.C. players
Nuneaton Borough F.C. players
Hinckley United F.C. players
Brackley Town F.C. players
Stratford Town F.C. players
Shepshed Dynamo F.C. players
Rugby Town F.C. players
Barwell F.C. players
English Football League players
League of Ireland players